This is a list of foreign ministers of the Sahrawi Arab Democratic Republic.

1976–1985: Ibrahim Hakim
1985–1988: Mansur Umar
1988–1995: Mohamed Salem Ould Salek
1995–1997: Malainine Sadik
1997–1998: Bachir Mustafa Sayed
1998–2023: Mohamed Salem Ould Salek
2023–present: Mohamed Sidati

References

Sources
Rulers.org – Foreign ministers S–Z

Foreign
Politicians
1976 establishments in Western Sahara